Bada is a mobile smartphone operating system developed by Samsung.

Bada may also refer to:

Education
 Bay Area Digital Arts or BADA, a school of digital arts in California, US
 British American Drama Academy or BADA, a theatre school in Britain

People
Bada (singer) (born 1980), South Korean singer
Jeffrey L. Bada (born 1942), American chemical evolutionist
Kim Bada (born 1971), South Korean rock musician
Sunday Bada (born 1969), Nigerian sprinter

Places
Bada (crater), a crater on Mars named after the village
Bada (rural locality), a rural locality (selo) in Zabaykalsky Krai, Russia
Bada (air base), an air base near the village
Bada (Wolaita), an administrative town of Hobicha Woreda, Wolayita Zone, Ethiopia
Bada, Davangere, a village in Davangere district, Karnataka, India
Bada, a village on Minicoy island, India

Other uses
Bada', a Shi'a Muslim concept of alteration in the divine will
Bada language, Sulawesi, Indonesia
Bada language (Nigeria)
British Antique Dealers' Association (BADA)

See also